Marali Manasagide is an Indian Kannada language drama on Star Suvarna which premiered on 9 August 2021. The series is a remake of Star Jalsha's Bengali series Kusum Dola. The show stars Divya Wagukar, Chandan Kumar and Shilpa Shetty.

Plot 
Spandana a young, courageous, and outspoken woman, who aspires to become an engineer and resides with her father Ramachandra. On the other hand, Vikranth Nayak, an aspiring IPS officer meets Vaishnavi a free-spirited girl on a trip where both of them fall in love with each other. At the end of the trip, he gets a call stated that he has been selected as an IPS officer, hearing that Vikranth leaves the trip and Vaishnavi to appoint to his job. At his oath-taking ceremony, he meets Spandana and her father Ramachandra who is Vikranth's senior officer. Later Vikranth's brother Shamanth marries Vaishnavi due to certain uncertain circumstances. Later Spandana marries Vikranth due to the promise Vikranth gave to her father. After the marriage, Vikranth tells Spandana not to expect any love from him as he has already given his love for Vaishnavi who is now his sister-in-law. How Vikranth and Spandana fall in love forms the rest of the story.

Cast

Main
 Divya Wagukar as Spandana Ramachandra, Vikranth's wife and Ramachandra's daughter
 Chandan Kumar as ASP Vikranth Nayak IPS, Spandana's husband
 Shilpa Shetty as Vaishnavi, Vikranth's love interest who later becomes Shamanth's wife

Recurring
 Vinay Gowda as Major Shamanth, Vikranth's cousin brother and Vaishnavi's Husband
 Harini Sreekanth / Nandini Gowda as Sujatha, Vikranth's Mother; Spandana's Mother-in-law
 Mareena Thara as Chandrakala; Ananth Kumar Nayak's elder sister-in-law
 Anikha Sindhya as Kavana, Vikranth and Shamanth's aunt
 Srinath Vasishta as Retd. Major Ananth Kumar Nayaka, Vikranth's Father; Spandana's Father-in-law
 Ashok as Bhavani Shankar, MLA Gopinath's son; Spandana's one-sided obsessive lover (Antagonist)
 Arvind Rao as DSP Ramachandra, Spandana's Father and Vikranth's mentor and colleague (dead)

Soundtrack 
The title song for the series Marali Manasaagide has been sung by singer Sinchana Chandan, Aishwarya Rangarajan and Jubin Paul. The original music has been given by Karthik Sharma.

Production 
The show marks the comeback of actor Chandan to serials after a  brief gap. The shows title track was shot in Bengaluru and the show is being filmed in Bengaluru.The opening episodes were shot in picturesque locations in Gokarna and Tumkur.

References

External links
 Official Website

2021 Indian television series debuts
Indian drama television series
Indian television soap operas
Kannada-language television shows
Star Suvarna original programming